Eyvanki District is a district (bakhsh) in Garmsar County, Semnan Province, Iran. At the 2006 census, its population was 17,324, in 3,555 families.   The District has one city: Eyvanki. The District has one rural district (dehestan): Eyvanki Rural District. Tati is the main language of the district.

References 

Districts of Semnan Province
Garmsar County